Michael Bobinski (born October 28, 1957) is the current Director of Athletics at Purdue University. Bobinski was named as the new athletic director for Purdue on August 9, 2016.  Prior to that, Bobinski was the athletic director at Georgia Tech, Xavier University and University of Akron.  He also held positions in the athletic department at the U.S. Naval Academy and the University of Notre Dame. Bobinski received his bachelor of business administration from Notre Dame, graduating magna cum laude, while playing for the Fighting Irish baseball team. He has been recognized nationally as the NACDA Division I Northeast AD of the year (2012) as well as the Chair of the Division I Men's Basketball Committee.

Early life
Bobinski attended Longwood High School where he was a standout baseball player named All-league, All-county and was the Longwood MVP his senior season.

References

External links
 Georgia Tech profile
 Purdue profile

1957 births
Living people
Akron Zips athletic directors
Georgia Tech Yellow Jackets athletic directors
Notre Dame Fighting Irish baseball players
Purdue Boilermakers athletic directors
Xavier Musketeers athletic directors
People from Long Island